Henrikson is a surname. Notable people with the surname include:

Alf Henrikson (1905–1995), Swedish writer, poet, and translator
Anders Henrikson (1896–1965), Swedish actor and film director
C. Robert Henrikson (born 1947), American corporate executive
Elna Henrikson, Swedish figure skater